Destroyer Squadron ONE, also known as Destroyer Squadron 1 and often abbreviated at DESRON ONE or DESRON 1, is a squadron of warships of the United States Navy. It is an operational component of Carrier Strike Group One and is administratively responsible to Commander, Naval Surface Forces Pacific.

The Squadron's combat mission is to support the Operational Commander (currently Carrier Strike Group One) in achieving optimum combat readiness for his ships and to ensure adherence to Type Commander requirements. As such, Commander, Destroyer Squadron One (COMDESRON-1) conducts continuous, extensive liaison and coordination with the assigned Operational Commander.  In addition to operations in the U.S. Third Fleet, the squadron's ships have deployed to the Persian Gulf as part of the U.S. Fifth Fleet, to the Western Pacific as part of the U.S. Seventh Fleet, and regularly support Joint Task Force North counter-drug operations in South America and the Caribbean Sea, as well as other fleet commitments.

Composition 
The current composition of the squadron includes:

 Squadron Headquarters, at Naval Base San Diego
 USS O'Kane (DDG-77)
 USS McCampbell (DDG-85)
 USS Mustin (DDG-89)
 USS Kidd (DDG-100)
 USS Sterett (DDG-104)
 USS Stockdale (DDG-106)

Mission
The Commander, Destroyer Squadron ONE is to direct, oversee and assist the ships of the squadron in achieving and maintaining the highest level of material, operational and personnel readiness.  When required, he shall exercise command over ships assigned for naval operations in order to achieve sea and air control in pursuit of national objectives. Function as Immediate Superior in Command (ISIC), for assigned ships and prepare them for sustained combat operations at sea. Prepare ships for assignment to operational commanders as directed by Commander, Naval Surface Forces Pacific Fleet and Commander Third Fleet. Maintain ISIC responsibilities throughout the life cycle of the ship, regardless of location or operational control, except in circumstances where otherwise directed. Provide administrative and material support that will include, but not be limited to: personnel support, OMBUDSMAN program support, ship's restricted availability (SRA), Refueling and Overhaul (ROH) and other maintenance availability planning and administrative assistance.

Operational history
Destroyer Squadron One was initially listed in the U.S. Navy's order of battle in the Navy Directories of 1919, but disappeared from the Naval Register in 1927.  In 1937, Destroyer Squadron Twenty (DESRON-20) was re-designated as Destroyer Squadron One.

World War Two
Destroyer Squadron One was present during the Attack on Pearl Harbor on 7 December 1941.  DESRON-1 destroyers served as part of Task Force 11 in the aborted relief efforts for Wake Island and Rabaul, as well as seeing action during the Battle of Coral Sea. DESRON-1 destroyers subsequently saw further action during the Battle of Midway and the Battle of the Eastern Solomons as part of Task Force 16. DESRON-1 destroyers subsequently provided shore bombardment as Fire-Support Group Love and anti-submarine/anti-aircraft support as Air Support Group 1 to the initial phase of the Guadalcanal campaign, and Destroyer Squadron One saw action during the Battle of the Komandorski Islands, the invasion of Attu, and the invasion of Kiska during the Aleutian Islands campaign.  In September 1943, the squadron returned to the West Coast for overhaul.

With Guadalcanal and the Aleutians secured, the U.S. Navy began its Central Pacific offensive with the Gilbert and Marshall Islands campaign undertaken between November 1943 and February 1944. Subsequently, DESRON-1 destroyers Farragut, and Monaghan screened the escort carrier force while Macdonough and Aylwin escorted the amphibious transport force during the landings on Kwajalein. Also, Dewey and Hull provided support to the amphibious reserve force, and Phelps supported mine-sweeping operations and Marine landings on Roi-Namur. Macdonough, Monaghan, and Aylwin provided shore bombardment support to the amphibious landings on Parry Island.

Following the conclusion of the Gilbert and Marshall campaign, DESRON-1 destroyers screened Task Group 58.1 during carrier air strikes against Palau, Yap, Ulithi, Woleai, Truk, Satawan, and Ponape.  DESRON-1 destroyers  also provided naval gunfire support to the Hollandia invasion which initiated the Western New Guinea campaign.

The next objective of the Central Pacific offensive was the Mariana Islands campaign that occurred between June and November 1944.  DESRON-1 destroyers screened Task Group 58.1 during this operation, while also carrying out individual ship assignments during the invasion.  Dewey, Hull, and Macdonough supported minesweeping and underwater demolition pre-invasion operations at Saipan while Farragut, Dale, Monaghan, and Aylwin carried out patrol and shore bombardment duties. Later, Task Group 58.1 and Destroyer Squadron One saw combat action during the Battle of the Philippine Sea.

In December 1944, while operating in support the Philippines Campaign, Task Force 38 was hit by a powerful typhoon, and DESRON-1 destroyers Monaghan and Hull were lost.  In February 1945, DESRON-1 destroyers Dewey, Farragut, Dale, and Aylwin screened the fleet logistic force supporting the invasion of Iwo Jima. On 1 March 1945, Destroyer Squadron One was re-designated as Destroyer Division 10 of Destroyer Squadron 5, and in this capacity, it participated in the invasion of Okinawa in April.

DESRON 1's original nine destroyers earned a combined total 103 service stars during the Asiatic-Pacific campaign, with 97 while attached to Destroyer Squadron 1.

Cold War
Destroyer Squadron One subsequently participated in the Korean War and the Taiwan Strait Patrols. Destroyer Squadron One was re-designated as Reserve Destroyer Squadron 27  (ResDesRon 27), established on January 13, 1958, which was subsequently re-designated Destroyer Squadron 27 (DesRon 27) in 1970 and Surface Squadron 1 (SS-1) in 1980 before being returned to its original designation of Destroyer Squadron One in October 1993.

Recent operations
Commander, Destroyer Squadron One (COMDESRON 1) was assigned as the Task Group Commander of the Cooperation Afloat Readiness and Training (CARAT) WESTPAC deployments to Southeast Asia from 2002-2007. CARAT is a rolling series of bilateral exercises conducted with the navies of the Republic of the Philippines, Indonesia, Brunei, Thailand, Malaysia, and Singapore. The primary mission of these deployments is to enhance cooperative engagement and naval interoperability with the participating Southeast Asian countries.

On 10 January 2011, two DESRON-1 guided-missile destroyers, Stockdale and Gridley, and their embarked detachments from Helicopter Anti-Submarine Squadron Light 49 (HSL-49) participated in a Passing Exercise (PASSEX) with the JMSDF helicopter destroyer Kurama in the Sea of Japan.  Later in the same day, Stockdale and Gridley participated in separate PASSEX maneuvers with units of the Republic of Korea Navy.  On 23 April 2011, the news media reported that the squadron's commodore, Captain Donald Hornbeck, was relieved of command by Carl Vinson strike group commander Rear Admiral Samuel Perez during an investigation into a possible improper relationship.  At the time, the squadron was on a deployment to the Arabian Sea.

DESRON ONE Commodores
World War Two

Destroyer/Surface Squadron One

See also
 History of the United States Navy

Notes

Sources

External links
 
 
 

Destroyer squadrons of the United States Navy
Military units and formations established in the 1910s
Military in San Diego